The 1999 Arizona Wildcats baseball team represented the University of Arizona during the 1999 NCAA Division I baseball season. The Wildcats played their home games at Frank Sancet Stadium. The team was coached by Jerry Stitt in his 3rd season at Arizona. The Wildcats finished 33-23 overall and placed 3rd in the Pacific-10 with a 13-11 record - the only time during Coach Stitt's tenure they would finish above .500 in conference play. The 1999 season season marked the 1st time that the Pac-10 did not play in divisions, as Portland State's discontinuation of baseball following the 1998 season caused the Northern Division to shrink to only 3 members (compared to the Southern Division's 6).

Arizona was selected into the postseason for the 1st time since 1993 as the 3-seed in the Waco Regional. They subsequently lost their first 2 games to 2-seed Minnesota and 4-seed Eastern Illinois to be eliminated from the tournament. This would be the only tournament appearance of Stitt's head coaching career and would be the last for the Wildcats until 2003.

Previous season 
The Wildcats finished the 1998 season with a record of 30-25 and 13-14 in conference play, finishing 4th in the "Six-Pac" (Pac-10 Southern). Arizona missed the postseason for the 5th straight season and 2nd time in Jerry Stitt's tenure.

Personnel

Roster

Coaches

Opening day

Schedule and results

Waco Regional

1999 MLB Draft

References 

Arizona Wildcats baseball seasons